Milan Ćalasan (born 29 October 1954) is a retired Slovenian-born Montenegrin football player, nowadays based in France where he's active as a players agent.

Football career
Ćalasan played for Red Star Belgrade, Olimpija Ljubljana and Dinamo Zagreb in the 1970s and 1980s before moving abroad and spending several seasons with Liège in Belgium and Rot-Weiss Essen in Germany.

After retiring from football, Ćalasan became a sports agent. His Paris-based sports agency (Mondialvas SARL) has managed careers of manager Arsène Wenger, Vahid Halilhodžić and Radomir Antić and footballers such as Christian Karembeu, Samuel Etoo, Vincent Kompany, Dragan Stojković, Nikola Žigić, Milinko Pantić, Anto Drobnjak, Florent Malouda, Džoni Novak, Ardian Kozniku, Branislav Ivanović, Patrick M'Boma, Mateo Pavlović, Franck Durix and Zoran Vulić as well as several players who played for Paris Saint-Germain in the early 2000s, such as Branko Bošković, Juan Pablo Sorín and Éric Rabésandratana.

From 1990 to 2001 he was the sports director of two Japanese football clubs, Nagoya Grampus Eight and Gamba Osaka. He was the first agent who brought European players and coaches such as Arsène Wenger and Frederic Antonetti in Japan.

Other activities
In May 2010, Ćalasan was mentioned in the Serbian media in connection to the controversial 2005 satellite rental contract in which another one of his companies, Camira Creek Corporation based in the Virgin Islands, acted as middleman between the Serbia and Montenegro state union and Israeli company Image Sat International. Ćalasan was reportedly involved in the negotiations between the two parties since the fall of 2004 at which time Serbia and Montenegro was represented by its defense minister Prvoslav Davinić and its president Svetozar Marović.

Davinić eventually signed off on the contract for the rental services of the EROS satellite for €45 million. According to allegations, the deal had not been authorized by the Serbian state authorities and the entire affair came under investigation conducted by the Serbian justice and defence ministries.

References

External links
 
 

Living people
1954 births
Sportspeople from Maribor
Yugoslav footballers
Slovenian footballers
Red Star Belgrade footballers
NK Olimpija Ljubljana (1945–2005) players
GNK Dinamo Zagreb players
RFC Liège players
Rot-Weiss Essen players
FC Gueugnon players
En Avant Guingamp players
US Orléans players
AS Béziers Hérault (football) players
Association football forwards
Yugoslav First League players
Belgian Pro League players
2. Bundesliga players
Ligue 2 players
Slovenian expatriate footballers
Expatriate footballers in Belgium
Expatriate footballers in Germany
Expatriate footballers in France
Association football agents